Salvador Nunatak is a nunatak 2 nautical miles (3.7 km) north of Schumann Nunatak, in the southwest part of Freyberg Mountains. Mapped by United States Geological Survey (USGS) from surveys and U.S. Navy air photos, 1960–64. Named by Advisory Committee on Antarctic Names (US-ACAN) for Anthony Salvador, ionospheric physics researcher at McMurdo Station in 1967.

Nunataks of Victoria Land
Pennell Coast